The 1977 European Wrestling Championships was held from 26 – 29 May 1977 in Bursa, Turkey.

Medal table

Medal summary

Men's freestyle

Men's Greco-Roman

References

External links
Fila's official championship website

Europe
W
European Wrestling Championships
Euro
1977 in European sport